Cristiano Monteiro da Matta (born 19 September 1973) is a Brazilian former professional racing driver. He won the CART Championship in 2002, and drove in Formula One with the Toyota team from 2003 to 2004.

Career biography

Origins and early career

Da Matta's father was Toninho da Matta, a 14-time Brazilian touring car champion. Born in Belo Horizonte, Cristiano da Matta began karting at the age of 16, adopting a helmet design nearly identical to his famous father's helmet. He quickly rose to the top by winning numerous karting championships before winning the 1993 Brazilian Formula Ford championship. In 1994, he continued his successful ways, winning the Brazilian Formula 3 championship against the likes of Hélio Castroneves and Ricardo Zonta. In 1995, da Matta participated in the British Formula 3 series, winning one race and placing eighth in the standings. He then placed 8th in the following year's Formula 3000 championship, with a best finish of 4th at Pau.

North American racing
1997 saw da Matta move to the United States for the Indy Lights racing series, in which he won Rookie of the Year honors. The next year (1998), he won the championship by winning 7 races and securing 4 pole positions. In 1999, da Matta raced in the CART series for Team Arciero Wells, which were running Toyota engines; da Matta drove a Toyota-powered car from then until 2004. His first win came in 2000, and despite some sponsor opposition he joined the front-running Newman/Haas Racing team for 2001. He won the CART drivers' championship in 2002 under Toyota power with the Newman/Haas Racing team, dominating the year with 7 race wins and 7 poles.

Formula One

Da Matta completed his move up the racing ladder in 2003, reaching the pinnacle of motor sport with the Toyota Formula One team. He scored 10 championship points that year, four more than seasoned veteran and teammate Olivier Panis, and soon made a name for himself in Formula One when he spent much of the first half of the 2003 Brazilian Grand Prix hounding reigning World Champion Michael Schumacher in the monsoon-hit race before ultimately finishing tenth. He led the 2003 British Grand Prix for seventeen laps after the race was disrupted by a protester who invaded the track and triggered the deployment of the Safety Car. This caused most of the front-running cars to make unscheduled pit stops leaving Da Matta in the lead, ultimately finishing seventh for one of four points-scoring finishes in his debut season. His fortunes took a downturn in 2004, however. Having scored only 3 championship points, da Matta lost his race seat to Ricardo Zonta after the German Grand Prix in Hockenheim. This was not only due to performance issues, but also due to Da Matta openly making statements about how uncompetitive the Toyota was.

Return to USA
In 2005, da Matta moved back to the Champ Car World Series, to race for the PKV Racing team. That season he won the race at Portland, and finished 11th overall in the standings. For the 2006 Champ Car season, he switched to the Dale Coyne Racing to drive the No.19 Ford Lola, until 9 June 2006, when he switched teams again, to take over A. J. Allmendinger's seat at RuSPORT. Second place at San Jose left him 6th overall in the series.

Collision with deer during test
On 3 August 2006, da Matta's car was involved in a collision with a deer that ran in front of him as he headed towards turn 6 during Champ Car open testing at Road America. He hit the deer with his right front tire, the deer then flew back and hit da Matta in the cockpit. It is believed when the deer hit da Matta in the cockpit, he was knocked unconscious. He remained unconscious with his foot still on the throttle when the safety crew arrived and extricated da Matta from the car. Da Matta was then airlifted to Theda Clark Medical Center in Neenah, Wisconsin, where he underwent surgery to remove a subdural hematoma. Following the surgery, da Matta was placed in an induced coma, to allow for the swelling to subside. As of 7 August, da Matta was making "slow but steady progress", while the doctors were working on reducing da Matta's level of sedation. This slow recovery was confirmed on 9 August, as it was reported that da Matta was able to move "all of his extremities spontaneously as well as in response to physical stimulation". On 20 August, da Matta was transferred out of intensive care. On 30 August, da Matta was confirmed to have made steady progress, conversing in English and Portuguese, and walking short distances. On 21 September 2006, da Matta was allowed to leave the hospital after having recovered better than expected.

When the Champ Car World Series returned to race in the Grand Prix of Road America on 24 September, da Matta gave the traditional command - "start your engines". Throughout the next couple of years, he engaged in a training and therapy regime while deciding his racing future.

Comeback
On 20 March 2008, da Matta climbed back into a race car for the first time since his accident, completing a two-day test in a Riley Daytona Prototype prepared by reigning Rolex Sports Car Series champions GAINSCO/Bob Stallings Racing. He found speed right away, and team owner Bob Stallings said "the comeback has begun." da Matta said, "After the test, I realized I still know how to do this", "The biggest thing I felt was just a sense of relief. For me, it was a big, big relief, bigger than big". da Matta paired with former Champ Car champion, Jimmy Vasser, to enter the Rolex Series racing at Mazda Raceway Laguna Seca in 2008. after a solid race, the pair were classified in 32nd position.

Brazilian Championship Formula Truck
In December 2009, da Matta tested a Fórmula Truck vehicle owned by Iveco, and in January 2010 confirmed that he would run the 2010 Fórmula Truck season for the team.

American Le Mans Series
In 2011 da Matta signed for Rocketsports Racing to race in the American Le Mans Series. He scored 6 points at the Grand Prix of Long Beach.

Film and media
Da Matta and his 1999 car appear in the movie Driven, starring Sylvester Stallone.

Da Matta is a playable character in the video games Formula One 2003 and Formula One 04.

In 2017, a documentary was released about his and his father's lives in motorsport, entitled "Família Gasolina" (Gasoline Family). It is available for free on YouTube.

Post-racing career
Da Matta is no longer racing and is involved in the financial and logistical side of the family Da Matta Design clothing business.

Racing career

Complete International Formula 3000 results
(key) (Races in bold indicate pole position) (Races in italics indicate fastest lap)

Complete Indy Lights results
(key)

Complete CART/Champ Car results
(key)

Complete Formula One results
(key) (Races in bold indicate pole position; races in italics indicate fastest lap)

† Did not finish the race, but was classified as he had completed more than 90% of the race distance.

Complete American Le Mans Series results

References

External links

 
 
 da Matta's profile provided by CBS SportsLine

1973 births
Living people
Sportspeople from Belo Horizonte
Brazilian people of Italian descent
Brazilian racing drivers
Brazilian Formula One drivers
Toyota Formula One drivers
Brazilian Champ Car drivers
Champ Car champions
Champ Car drivers
Indy Lights champions
Indy Lights drivers
Formula 3 Sudamericana drivers
British Formula Three Championship drivers
International Formula 3000 drivers
American Le Mans Series drivers
Brazilian Formula Three Championship drivers
Tasman Motorsports drivers
Newman/Haas Racing drivers
KV Racing Technology drivers
Dale Coyne Racing drivers
RuSPORT drivers